Root of all evil or Root of evil may refer to:

Music
 The Root of All Evil (album), a 2009 album by Swedish death metal band Arch Enemy
 The Root of All Evil (EP), Japanese work by all-female tribute band Iron Maidens
 "The Root of All Evil", part of the Twelve-step Suite and the first track of the album Octavarium, by Dream Theater
 "The Root of All Evil", a song by The Beautiful South
 "The Root of All Evil", a song by Snoop Doggy Dogg from Death Row: The Lost Sessions Vol. 1
 "Root of All Evil", a song by The Underachievers from their debut mixtape Indigoism
 "Money Is the Root of All Evil", a 1940s song by Whitney and Kramer, featured in the film High Time

Film, television and radio
 Root of Evil: The True Story of the Hodel Family and the Black Dahlia, a 2019 podcast about an unsolved murder
 The Root of Evil (film), 1912 silent short film directed by D. W. Griffith
 The Root of All Evil (1947 film), British drama starring Phyllis Calvert and Michael Rennie
 The Root of All Evil? (1968 TV series), British anthology TV series
 The Root of All Evil?, a 2006 UK television documentary, retitled The God Delusion discussing religious faith and starring Richard Dawkins
 Lewis Black's Root of All Evil, a television series aired on Comedy Central featuring comedian Lewis Black
 The Root of All Evil Radio Show, a radio show broadcast from KFAI in Minneapolis, US, hosted by Earl Root
 Born Rich (TV series), 2009 Hong Kong television drama known as Root of Evil in the original Cantonese
 "Roots of Evil" (Voltron Force), a 2012 episode
 "The Root of Evil" (Amphibia), an episode of Amphibia

Other
 The Root of Evil, 1911 novel by Thomas Dixon, Jr.
 "The Root of All Evil", a short story by Graham Greene
 The Root of All Evil, a User Friendly webcomic compilation book alluding to the Unix concept of the root user
 Roots of Evil (Ravenloft), 1993 video game released as part of the Advanced Dungeons & Dragons game
 The Root of All Evil (D&D Adventure), video game released as part of Dungeons & Dragons
 Death Jr. II: Root of Evil,  2008 action-adventure game for PlayStation Portable, the sequel to Death Jr.
 Good and evil, philosophical concept often involving the "root of all evil"
 Love of money - Christian biblical concept; according to 1 Timothy 6:10 "For the love of money is the root of all of evil"
 Radix malorum est cupiditas, a Biblical quotation in Latin that literally means "the root of evil is greed", or "the root of evil is want"

See also
 Route of All Evil (disambiguation)

New Testament words and phrases